Roger Capellani (31 January 1905 – 30 May 1940) was a French film director, the son of film director and screenwriter Albert Capellani and the nephew of the actor Paul Capellani.

He shot French versions of foreign films for the studios of the Paramount Pictures located at Joinville-le-Pont (Val-de-Marne), and worked several times for the screenwriter .

He died at the battle of Dunkirk.

Filmography

External links 
 

Film directors from Paris
1905 births
1940 deaths
French military personnel killed in World War II
French Army personnel of World War II